East Selah is an unincorporated community in Yakima County, Washington, United States, located east of Selah adjacent to the Yakima River.

Climate
According to the Köppen Climate Classification system, East Selah has a semi-arid climate, abbreviated "BSk" on climate maps.

References

Unincorporated communities in Yakima County, Washington
Unincorporated communities in Washington (state)
Populated places on the Yakima River